Cannabis in Comoros is currently illegal as of September 2019. Between January 1975 and May 1978, cannabis in Comoros was legal, legalized by president Ali Soilih.

References

Comoros
Politics of the Comoros
Society of the Comoros